Amata prepuncta is a species of moth of the family Erebidae first described by Jeremy Daniel Holloway in 1988. It is found on Borneo.

References 

prepuncta
Moths described in 1988
Moths of Borneo